Johannes Frederick Klopper "Hannes" Marais (born 21 September 1941) is a former South African rugby captain. He was capped 35 times, scoring one try.

Personal history
Marais was born in the town of Somerset East and grew up on a farm near Cookhouse. He attended Gill College in Somerset East, a school that also produced the Springbok brothers Willie and Michael du Plessis. After school he went to study agriculture at the prestigious Stellenbosch University, with the intention of becoming a veterinarian. Later on he did his doctorate at the University of Port Elizabeth, the forerunner of the Nelson Mandela Metropolitan University.

Rugby career
In his schooldays he was a loose forward, but was converted into a prop by Danie Craven when he went to Stellenbosch.

At provincial level, he represented Western Province as well as now-defunct North Eastern Cape and Eastern Province.

He won his first cap against Australia in 1963 and his last against France in 1974. He became captain in 1971 after having served as vice-captain in 1970.

After retiring from first-class rugby, he continued to play for his hostel team at university for five seasons and stopped playing altogether just shy of his 40th birthday.

Life after rugby
After his retirement from playing, he coached the University of Port Elizabeth's as well as the Eastern Province under-20 sides and was also the assistant coach to the Eastern Province senior team for a while. He served as a Springbok selector from 1982 through 1986, and then again from 1993 up to the 1995 Rugby World Cup.

See also
 President's Overseas XV
 1969–70 South Africa rugby union tour
 List of South Africa national rugby union players – Springbok no. 390

References

Bibliography

External links
 
 Hannes Marais at the Springbok Rugby Hall of Fame

1941 births
Living people
People from Somerset East
Afrikaner people
South African rugby union players
South Africa international rugby union players
Rugby union props
South Africa national rugby union team captains
Rugby union players from the Eastern Cape
Western Province (rugby union) players